John Carey,  (born 5 April 1934) is a British literary critic, and post-retirement (2002) emeritus Merton Professor of English Literature at the University of Oxford.  He is known for his anti-elitist views on high culture, as expounded in several books.  He has twice chaired the Booker Prize committee, in 1982 and 2004, and chaired the judging panel for the first Man Booker International Prize in 2005.

Education and career
He was born in Barnes, London, and educated at Richmond and East Sheen Boys' Grammar School, winning an Open Scholarship to St John's College, Oxford. He has held posts in a number of Oxford colleges, and is an emeritus fellow of Merton, where he became a Professor in 1975, retiring in 2002.

Literary criticism
Carey's scholarly work is generally agreed to be of the highest order and greatly influential.  Among these productions is his co-edition, with Alastair Fowler, of the Poems of John Milton (Longman, 1968; revised 1980; 2nd ed. 2006); John Donne: Life, Mind, and Art (Faber and Faber, 1981; revised 1990), a revolutionary study of Donne's work in the light of his life and family history; and The Violent Effigy: A Study of Dickens's Imagination (1973; 2nd ed. 1991).

He has twice chaired the Booker Prize committee, in 1982 and 2004, and chaired the judging panel for the first Man Booker International Prize in 2005. He is chief book reviewer for the London Sunday Times and appears in radio and TV programmes including Saturday Review and Newsnight Review

Views
He is known for his anti-elitist views on high culture, as expressed for example in his book What Good Are the Arts? (2005). Carey's 1992 book The Intellectuals and the Masses: Pride and Prejudice among the Literary Intelligentsia, 1880–1939 was a critique of Modernist writers (particularly T. S. Eliot, Virginia Woolf, W. B. Yeats, D. H. Lawrence and H. G. Wells) for what Carey argues were their elitist and misanthropic views of mass society; in their place he called for a reappraisal of Arnold Bennett, 'the hero of this book', whose 'writings represent a systematic dismemberment of the intellectuals' case against the masses'. In his review of the book Geoff Dyer wrote that Carey picked out negative quotations from his subjects, while Stefan Collini responded that disdain for mass culture among some Modernist writers was already well-known among literary historians.

Memoir 
In 2014 he published a memoir the Unexpected Professor. It comprised distinct parts; childhood in wartime and the era of rationing, schooling, national service in the army; the academic career and scholarly study; his later period of book reviewing and literary journalism.

The early career described his first encounters with poetry, among them Milton, Jonson, Donne, Browning. The book contained crisp critical summaries of prose writers, among them Thackeray, Lawrence and Orwell.

Personal 
Carey was born in April 1934 in Barnes, then on the Surrey/London border, the youngest of their four recorded children, to Charles W. Carey and Winifred E. Carey, née Cook. He was for decades a beekeeper.

Works

The Poems of John Milton (1968) editor with Alastair Fowler
Andrew Marvell: A Critical Anthology (1969) editor
The Private Memoirs and Confessions of a Justified Sinner by James Hogg (1969) editor
John Milton (1969)
Complete Shorter Poems of John Milton (1971), revised 2nd edition (1997) editor
The Violent Effigy. A Study of Dickens' Imagination (1973) published in America as Here Comes Dickens. The Imagination of a Novelist. Republished in Faber Finds (2008)John Milton, Christian Doctrine (1971) translator
Thackeray: Prodigal Genius (1977) republished in Faber Finds (2008)
English Renaissance Studies: Presented To Dame Helen Gardner In Honour Of Her Seventieth Birthday (1979)
John Donne: Life, Mind and Art (1981) new revised edition (1990) republished in Faber Finds (2008)
William Golding : The Man and His Books (1986) editor
Faber Book of Reportage (1987) editor. Published in America as Eyewitness to History, Harvard University Press, (1987) 
Original Copy : Selected Reviews and Journalism 1969–1986 (1987)
John Donne. The Major Works (1990) editor, Oxford Authors, reprinted with revisions (2000) World's Classics
The Intellectuals and the Masses: Pride and Prejudice among the Literary Intelligentsia, 1880–1939 (1992)
Short Stories and the Unbearable Bassington by Saki (1994) editor
Faber Book of Science (1995) editor.  Published in America as Eyewitness to Science: Scientists and Writers Illuminate Natural Phenomena from Fossils to Fractals, Harvard University Press, (1997)
Selected Poetry of John Donne (1998) editor
Faber Book of Utopias (2000) editor
Pure Pleasure: a Guide to the Twentieth Century's Most Enjoyable Books (2000)
George Orwell, Essays (2002) editor
Vanity Fair by William Thackeray (2002) editor
What Good are the Arts? (2005)
William Golding: The Man Who Wrote 'Lord of the Flies''' (2009)The Unexpected Professor: An Oxford Life in Books (2014)The Essential 'Paradise Lost (2017)A Little History of Poetry, Yale University Press (2020)100 Poets: A Little Anthology, Yale University Press (2021)Sunday Best: 80 Great Books from a Lifetime of Reviews, Yale University Press (2022)

References

External links

"A Talent for Writing, and Falling Into Things" Dwight Garner, The New York Times'', 6 July 2010

1934 births
Living people
British literary critics
People from Barnes, London
Fellows of the Royal Society of Literature
Fellows of St John's College, Oxford
Fellows of Merton College, Oxford
James Tait Black Memorial Prize recipients
Merton Professors of English Literature
Fellows of the British Academy